Kyaswa was viceroy of Prome (Pyay) from  1305 to 1344. He was a younger brother of the patricide governor Thihathu of Prome, and son of King Narathihapate of Pagan.

Notes

References

Bibliography
 
 
 
 

Pagan dynasty
Myinsaing dynasty
Pinya dynasty
14th-century Burmese people
13th-century Burmese people